Burnham Beeches is a 1930s streamline-moderne mansion built for  Aspro sales magnate Alfred Nicholas on Sherbrooke Road, Sherbrooke, Victoria in the Dandenong Ranges, 40 kilometres from Melbourne, Victoria, Australia.

History

Built during the late 1920s and 1930s, the property was named after the English National Forest of Beech trees in the county of Buckinghamshire, near the location of Nicholas's United Kingdom Aspro factory.

The architect was Harry Norris, who had toured Europe and America in 1929 for G J Coles to research the latest elements in chain-store design and construction before he finalised the plans for Coles store No. 12, the Bourke Street store, in Melbourne.  Nicholas and Norris were neighbours in Melbourne, and Norris was engaged to design a house with the brief that it was to have “fresh air, sunshine and an outlook of command, yet under control”. Nicholas visited the Chelsea Flower Show in 1929, obtained many plants and engaged a Cornishman, Percival Trevaskis, to do the landscaping.

Norris’s design was for a three-storey mansion in the Art Deco Streamline Moderne style.  The house was completed in 1933. The lines are said to be reminiscent of an ocean liner.  The zig-zag motif was used as decoration on the decorative wrought-iron work and the balcony balustrades.  The exterior of the house was of reinforced concrete, painted white and decorated with Australian motifs of koalas and possums in moulded relief panels.

A contemporary journal article cited in a 1980s pamphlet stated that the house included a “private theaterette with talkie equipment”, an “electric pipe-organ” in the music room, orchid houses, a dairy with “prize Jersey cows”, and the gardens included artificial waterfalls, a lake and floodlighting at night.

Nicholas died in 1937 and was survived by his widow, Isabel and two children.

In 1941, during World War II, the house was loaned as a children’s hospital.  After the war from 1948-50 it was redecorated by Nicholas’s widow.  Mrs Nicholas moved from the house to Toorak in Melbourne in 1954.  Two additional wings called the Garden and Forest wings were constructed during the 1950s and 1960s.

From 1955, the Nicholas Institute used the house as a research facility.  The gardens, having been named the ‘Alfred Nicholas Memorial Gardens’, were donated to the Shire of Sherbrooke in 1965 and were transferred to the Forests Commission of Victoria in 1973.  In 1981 the house was sold and operated as a small hotel for about a decade.

Redevelopment

The hotel was last operated by Adrian Zencha (Aman Resorts) in 1991. A group of investors commenced works in 2005 but ceased those works in 2008.

The property was purchased in 2010 by investor Adam Garrisson (Oriental Pacific Group) and chef and restaurateur Shannon Bennett.

The pair have proposed to utilise the buildings and grounds to create a "sustainable resort" with hotel, spa, wellness centre, villas, café, bakery, function areas and restaurant. The proposal is ambitious with much residential accommodation included, and is therefore proving to be contentious because of the possible adverse impact on existing residents and the overall very special nature of the Sherbrooke/Dandenongs region;  there are also concerns over health and safety issues such as traffic management and bushfire response. The proposal was rejected pending further information at the Yarra Ranges Council meeting of 11 August 2015.

In March 2019, Burnham Beeches was transformed into an art installation by street artist Rone aka Tyrone Wright, ahead of its conversion into a luxury hotel beginning in mid-2019.

See also
Nicholas Building

References

External links 
  includes photographs taken in 2000 after several years where the house was unused.

Art Deco architecture in Melbourne
Houses in Victoria (Australia)
Streamline Moderne architecture in Australia
Buildings and structures in the Shire of Yarra Ranges
Heritage-listed buildings in Melbourne
1933 establishments in Australia
Houses completed in 1933